Figure skating has been part of the Olympic Games since 1908 and has been included in 26 Olympic Games. There have been 286 medals (96 gold, 95 silver, and 95 bronze) awarded to figure skaters representing 29 representing National Olympic Committees (NOCs). Six events have been contested but one, men's special figures, was discontinued after a single Olympics. The team event is the newest Olympic figure skating event, first contested in the 2014 Games. It combines the four Olympic figure skating disciplines (men's singles, ladies' singles, pairs, and ice dance) into a single event with the team earning the most placement points winning gold.

German figure skater Maxi Herber is the youngest Olympic figure skating champion (at the age of 15 years and 128 days) when she won gold in pair skating together with Ernst Baier at the 1936 Winter Olympics.

American figure skater Scott Allen is the youngest Olympic medalist in figure skating. He won the bronze medal at the 1964 Winter Olympics two days before his 15th birthday.

Finnish figure skater Walter Jakobsson is the oldest Olympic figure skating champion. At age 38, he won the gold medal with his partner Ludowika Jakobsson at the 1920 Olympics.

British figure skater Edgar Syers is the oldest Olympic medalist in figure skating. At age 45, he won the bronze medal with his wife Madge Syers at the 1908 Olympics.

Medalists
The following lists show the Olympic medalists in figure skating ordered by the age of the skater, or by the average age of the two skaters.

Men's singles

Men's special figures

Ladies' singles

Pairs

Ice dance

Age records

Youngest champions

The following lists show the top 10 youngest female and male Olympic figure skating champions ordered by the age of the skater.

Female

Male

Youngest medalists

The following lists show the top 10 youngest female and male Olympic medalists in figure skating ordered by the age of the skater.

Female

Male

Oldest champions

The following lists show the top 10 oldest female and male Olympic figure skating champions ordered by the age of the skater.

Female

Male

Oldest medalists

The following lists show the top 10 oldest female and male Olympic medalists in figure skating ordered by the age of the skater.

Female

Male

See also
Figure skating at the Olympic Games
List of Olympic medalists in figure skating
World Figure Skating Championships
Major achievements in figure skating by nation

Notes

References
General
International Skating Union's Skater Biographies  (accessed August 3, 2010). This page is a gateway to listings, by discipline, of the official biographies submitted to the ISU from their most recent year of competition under ISU jurisdiction. It does not list most skaters who competed prior to 2000.* 
 ISU – Olympic Games Figure Skating results:
 1908–2002 Men Ladies Pairs Ice dance
 2006 2010 2014 2018 2022

Specific

External links
 International Skating Union

Medalists
Olympic Games
Figure skating
Age